The Responsibility of Shipowners Act 1733 (7 Geo. II, c.15) was an Act of Parliament of the Parliament of Great Britain passed in 1734. The Act was introduced for the protection of shipowners, following a petition presented to the House of Commons, and passed without a division in either House. It imposed a limit on the liability of shipowners in regards to goods embezzled by the master or crew of the ship carrying them. The liability for any loss or damage of goods was limited to the value of the vessel, her equipment, and any freight due for the voyage. The Act was held to apply in the case of Sutton v. Mitchell, (1785) 1 T.R. 18, where goods were stolen from a ship moored in the Thames by robbers colluding with a member of the crew. However, this emphasised the liability shipowners were still exposed to in cases where the goods were stolen without the involvement of the crew; as a result, a second petition was brought to the House, leading to the passage of the Merchant Shipping Act 1786.

This Act was repealed by section 4 of the Merchant Shipping Repeal Act 1854 (c.120).

Sources
Fletcher, Eric G. M. The Carrier's Liability, pp. 175-176. Stevens & Sons, 1932.
Lord Mustill "Ships are different - or are they?" [1993] Lloyd's Maritime and Commercial Law Quarterly 490, pp 496-497.

Shipping in the United Kingdom
Repealed Great Britain Acts of Parliament
Great Britain Acts of Parliament 1733